Josef Niedermair was an Italian luger who competed in the early 1970s. A natural track luger, he won a gold medal in the men's doubles event at the 1971 FIL European Luge Natural Track Championships in Vandans, Austria. In 1970, he also won a bronze medal in the men's singles event at the 4th European Cup in Inzing, Austria.

References

Year of birth missing
Possibly living people
Sportspeople from Südtirol
Italian male lugers
Italian lugers